The Averasboro Battlefield and Museum is dedicated to the Battle of Averasborough, a Civil War battle fought on March 16, 1865. The museum, founded in 1994 by the Averasboro Battlefield Commission, Inc, is located on the battlefield in Dunn, North Carolina.  The Battlefield attained National Register Historic District status in May 2001.  Also on the battlefield and considered to be part of the museum is the restored Chicora Civil   Cemetery.

The Civil War Trust (a division of the American Battlefield Trust) and its partners have acquired and preserved  of the battlefield.

See also
North Carolina Civil War Trails Program

References

External links
official site

American Civil War battlefields
Museums in Harnett County, North Carolina
American Civil War museums in North Carolina